In physics, angular acceleration refers to the time rate of change of angular velocity. As there are two types of angular velocity, namely spin angular velocity and orbital angular velocity, there are naturally also two types of angular acceleration, called spin angular acceleration and orbital angular acceleration respectively. Spin angular acceleration refers to the angular acceleration of a rigid body about its centre of rotation, and orbital angular acceleration refers to the angular acceleration of a point particle about a fixed origin.

Angular acceleration is measured in units of angle per unit time squared (which in SI units is radians per second squared), and is usually represented by the symbol alpha (α). In two dimensions, angular acceleration is a pseudoscalar whose sign is taken to be positive if the angular speed increases counterclockwise or decreases clockwise, and is taken to be negative if the angular speed increases clockwise or decreases counterclockwise. In three dimensions, angular acceleration is a pseudovector.

For rigid bodies, angular acceleration must be caused by a net external torque. However, this is not so for non-rigid bodies: For example, a figure skater can speed up her rotation (thereby obtaining an angular acceleration) simply by contracting her arms and legs inwards, which involves no external torque.

Orbital angular acceleration of a point particle

Particle in two dimensions 

In two dimensions, the orbital angular acceleration is the rate at which the two-dimensional orbital angular velocity of the particle about the origin changes. The instantaneous angular velocity ω at any point in time is given by

 

Therefore, the instantaneous angular acceleration α of the particle is given by

 

Expanding the right-hand-side using the product rule from differential calculus, this becomes

 

In the special case where the particle undergoes circular motion about the origin,  becomes just the tangential acceleration , and  vanishes (since the distance from the origin stays constant), so the above equation simplifies to

 

In two dimensions, angular acceleration is a number with plus or minus sign indicating orientation, but not pointing in a direction. The sign is conventionally taken to be positive if the angular speed increases in the counter-clockwise direction or decreases in the clockwise direction, and the sign is taken negative if the angular speed increases in the clockwise direction or decreases in the counter-clockwise direction. Angular acceleration then may be termed a pseudoscalar, a numerical quantity which changes sign under a parity inversion, such as inverting one axis or switching the two axes.

Particle in three dimensions 

In three dimensions, the orbital angular acceleration is the rate at which three-dimensional orbital angular velocity vector changes with time. The instantaneous angular velocity vector  at any point in time is given by

 

where  is the particle's position vector,  its distance from the origin, and  its velocity vector.

Therefore, the orbital angular acceleration is the vector  defined by

 

Expanding this derivative using the product rule for cross-products and the ordinary quotient rule, one gets:

 

In the case where the distance  of the particle from the origin does not change with time (which includes circular motion as a subcase), the second term vanishes and the above formula simplifies to

 

From the above equation, one can recover the cross-radial acceleration in this special case as:

 

Unlike in two dimensions, the angular acceleration in three dimensions need not be associated with a change in the angular speed : If the particle's position vector "twists" in space, changing its instantaneous plane of angular displacement, the change in the direction of the angular velocity  will still produce a nonzero angular acceleration. This cannot not happen if the position vector is restricted to a fixed plane, in which case  has a fixed direction perpendicular to the plane.

The angular acceleration vector is more properly called a pseudovector: It has three components which transform under rotations in the same way as the Cartesian coordinates of a point do, but which do not transform like Cartesian coordinates under reflections.

Relation to torque 

The net torque on a point particle is defined to be the pseudovector

 

where  is the net force on the particle.

Torque is the rotational analogue of force: it induces change in the rotational state of a system, just as force induces change in the translational state of a system. As force on a particle is connected to acceleration by the equation , one may write a similar equation connecting torque on a particle to angular acceleration, though this relation is necessarily more complicated.

First, substituting  into the above equation for torque, one gets

 

From the previous section:

 

Therefore:

 

In the special case of constant distance  of the particle from the origin, the second term in the above equation vanishes and the above equation simplifies to

 

However, unlike , this equation does not apply to an arbitrary trajectory, only to a trajectory contained within a spherical shell about the origin.

See also 
 Torque
 Angular momentum
 Angular frequency
 Angular velocity

References

Acceleration
Kinematic properties
Rotation
Torque
Temporal rates